Isaac Hill (April 6, 1788March 22, 1851) was an American politician, journalist, political commentator and newspaper editor who was a United States senator and the 16th governor of New Hampshire, serving two consecutive terms. 

Hill was born on April 6, 1788, in West Cambridge, Massachusetts, (now Belmont), shortly after the American colonies had won their independence from Great Britain. Born into a relatively poor family, his parents were Isaac and Hannah (Russell) Their marriage brought nine children, with Isaac being the eldest of the siblings. He was a member of the Democratic Party and supported the policies of President Andrew Jackson, while he was a bitter political opponent of President John Quincy Adams.

He also supported John C. Calhoun for the presidency in 1844. Hill's caustic newspaper editorials were the source of much political controversy among political parties and cost him a nomination to the Senate, but he later won a second nomination and was elected Senator of New Hampshire in 1820, ultimately serving for two terms. Hill was also a successful speculator in the railroad business, real estate, banking and various manufacturing enterprises.

In the latter part of his life Hill became active in other ventures including railroads, real estate, banking and manufacturing enterprises and became moderately wealthy and accumulated a considerable estate. He was active in the promotion of various agricultural improvements. In his last years Hill suffered constantly from asthma. Hill died on March 22, 1851 in Washington, D.C., and was buried at Blossom Hill Cemetery in Concord, New Hampshire. The town of Hill, New Hampshire, is named after him.

See also

 List of governors of New Hampshire

Citations

Bibliography

External links

 Cyrus Parker Bradley,  Biography of Isaac Hill, of New-Hampshire, 1835
. Retrieved January 13, 2014.
 

1789 births
1851 deaths
19th-century American newspaper publishers (people)
Democratic Party governors of New Hampshire
Democratic Party United States senators from New Hampshire
New Hampshire Jacksonians
New Hampshire Democratic-Republicans
Democratic-Republican Party United States senators
Democratic Party New Hampshire state senators
Democratic Party members of the New Hampshire House of Representatives
People from Arlington, Massachusetts
Politicians from Concord, New Hampshire
Andrew Jackson
United States Department of the Treasury officials
Burials in New Hampshire
People from Ashburnham, Massachusetts